Karkarpko Island (Ostrov Karkarpko) is a small island in the Chukchi Sea.

This island is only  in length.  

Karkarpko Island has a Stationary Observation Site for environmental observations, like the monitoring of species.

See also 
 List of islands of Russia

References

External links 
 Report 
 Polar bears

Islands of the Chukchi Sea
Islands of Chukotka Autonomous Okrug